Events in the year 1917 in Portugal.

Incumbents
President: Bernardino Machado
Prime Minister: Four different.

Events
13 October – Miracle of the Sun near Fátima
The Portuguese Naval Aviation established

Arts and entertainment

Sports
Académico de Viseu FC founded

Births
31 January – Manuel da Luz Afonso, football manager (d. 2000)
18 March – Joaquim Teixeira, footballer
5 June – José Baptista Pinheiro de Azevedo, politician (d. 1983)
27 June – Artur Quaresma, footballer
1 August – Manuel Soares Marques, footballer (d. 1987).
29 October – Virgilio Teixeira, actor
22 December – Eduardo Lopes, cyclist (d.1997)

Deaths

5 March – Manuel de Arriaga, lawyer and politician (born 1840)
18 March – António José de Ávila, 2nd Marquis of Ávila and Bolama, military officer, politician, nobility (b. 1842)
5 June – António Teixeira de Sousa, physician and politician (b. 1857)
6 November – António Júlio da Costa Pereira de Eça, Army general (b. 1852)

Full date missing
Abel Botelho, military officer and diplomat (b. 1855)
Hermenegildo Capelo, Navy officer (b. 1841)
Guilherme de Vasconcelos Abreu, writer, cartographer and orientalist (b. 1842)

References

 
1910s in Portugal
Portugal
Years of the 20th century in Portugal
Portugal